Frantz Rosenberg (27 January 1883 – 18 January 1956) was a Norwegian sport shooter. He was born in Oslo, and his club was Oslo Sportsskyttere. He competed in trap shooting at the 1912 Summer Olympics in Stockholm.

References

External links

1883 births
1956 deaths
Sportspeople from Oslo
Shooters at the 1912 Summer Olympics
Olympic shooters of Norway
Norwegian male sport shooters
20th-century Norwegian people